The 2010–11 season marked the creation of the first professional league in the territories and saw high-profile signings for many clubs. Most notably Fadi Lafi (Hilal Al-Quds), Hernán Madrid (Wadi Al-Nes), and many Arab citizens of Israel who played for teams in the second and third tier of Israeli football.

The original format of the WBPL consisted of 12 teams playing each other twice over 22 matchdays, the bottom two clubs are relegated to the second division and the team with the most points are crowned champions. Markaz Shabab Al-Am'ari won the inaugural season beating out Hilal Al-Quds on goal differential.

The 2011–12 included only 10 teams but the PFA have announced that four teams will be promoted from the First Division returning the league to its traditional 12-team format. The PFA also altered the rules on player eligibility banning the use of foreign players but letting teams have an unlimited amount of Arab Israeli citizens in their squads.

Before professionalization
 In 1977, Silwan won a five-team league on 28 points ahead of Al-Arabi Beit Safafa, YMCA, Al-Bireh Group, and Shabab Al-Khaleel.
 In 1982, Shabab Al-Khaleel won a 24-team league on 81 points five points ahead of closest challengers YMCA.
 In 1984, Markaz Tulkarem won a 12-team league on 60 points one point ahead of closest challengers Hateen.
 In 1985, Shabab Al-Khaleel won their second league title, the league once again featured 12 teams. Shabab Al-Khaleel finished on 60 points, six ahead of Thaqafi Tulkarm.
 In 1997, Markaz Shabab Al-Am'ari won their first league title on 64 points, the league featured 16 teams, Thaqafi Tulkarm finished as runner-up on 53 points.
 In 2008–09, Taraji Wadi Al-Nes won a 22-team league that would determine the members of the First and Second Division. They collected 49 points from 21 games.
 In 2009–10 Jabal Al-Mukaber won a 12-team league, the last before the PFA instituted a professional set-up. They collected 49 points from 22 games, 7 more than their closest challengers Hilal Al-Quds.

Clubs
Season 2022–23 clubs:

Past champions
The winners were:
1977: Silwan
1982: Shabab Al-Khalil
1984: Markaz Tulkarem
1985: Shabab Al-Khalil (2)
1986: Shabab Al-Khalil (3)
1997: Markaz Shabab Al-Am'ari
1999: Shabab Al-Khalil (4)
2000: Wadi Al-Nes 
2006: Markaz Tulkarem (2)
2007: Wadi Al-Nes (2)
2008–09: Taraji Wadi Al-Nes
2009–10: Jabal Al-Mukaber Club
2010–11: Markaz Shabab Al-Am'ari (2)
2011–12: Hilal Al-Quds
2012–13: Shabab Al-Dhahiriya
2013–14: Taraji Wadi Al-Nes (2)
2014–15: Shabab Al-Dhahiriya (2)
2015–16: Shabab Al-Khalil (5)
2016–17: Hilal Al-Quds (2)
2017–18: Hilal Al-Quds (3)
2018–19: Hilal Al-Quds (4)
2019–20: Markaz Balata
2020–21: Shabab Al-Khalil (6)
2021–22: Shabab Al-Khalil (7)

References

External links
League at FIFA.com
League at Soccerway.com

 
1
Top level football leagues in Asia
Sport in the West Bank
Sports leagues established in 1944
1944 establishments in Mandatory Palestine